Hickory Aviation Museum is an aviation museum at the Hickory Regional Airport  in Hickory, North Carolina. It features a museum located in the former airport terminal with artifacts, a hangar with aircraft and outdoor exhibits of aircraft on the former airport ramp.

History
The museum originated from the Sabre Society, which was formed in 1991 to restore a North American FJ-3 Fury on display at a ballpark in Taylorsville, North Carolina. Co-founded by Kyle and Kregg Kirby, it opened to the public on 19 May 2007.

In 2022, plans were announced for a new building located at Hickory Regional Airport. In addition to housing the museum's aircraft, it will also serve as a training facility for the Catawba Valley Community College. The new facility will cost a total of $22 Million, with $15 Million appropriated from the state budget and the remaining $7 Million from museum fundraising. Stipulations of the plan include relinquishing the spot the museum has within the commercial terminal should commercial operations return to Hickory Regional Airport.

Collection

 Beechcraft T-34C Turbo Mentor
 Bell AH-1W SuperCobra
 Curtiss XF15C-1
 de Havilland Vampire
 Douglas A-4L Skyhawk
 Grumman A-6E Intruder
 Eastern FM-2 Wildcat
 Grumman F-9 Cougar
 Grumman F-14A Tomcat – cockpit
 Grumman F-14D Tomcat
 Grumman OV-1D Mohawk
 Hispano HA-200 Saeta
 Howard GH-3 Nightingale
 Lockheed P-3C Orion
 Lockheed T-33A
 LTV A-7A Corsair II
 McDonnell F-101 Voodoo
 McDonnell Douglas F-4B Phantom II
 McDonnell Douglas F/A-18A Hornet
 North American FJ-3M Fury
 North American T-2 Buckeye
 Northrop F-5E Tiger II
 Northrop Grumman EA-6B Prowler
 Republic F-105B Thunderchief
 Sikorsky SH-3H Sea King

See also
 Carolinas Aviation Museum
 North Carolina Aviation Museum
 List of aerospace museums

References

Notes

Bibliography

External links
 

Aerospace museums in North Carolina
Museums in Catawba County, North Carolina
Hickory, North Carolina